Syrnola aganea is a species of sea snail, a marine gastropod mollusk in the family Pyramidellidae, the pyrams and their allies.

Description
The length of the shell measures 7.5 mm.

Distribution
The type specimen of this marine species was found off Port Alfred, South Africa.

References

External links
 To World Register of Marine Species

Pyramidellidae
Gastropods described in 1915